The Later Jin invasion of Joseon occurred in early 1627 when the Later Jin prince Amin led an invasion of the Joseon dynasty. The war ended after three months with the Later Jin establishing itself as sovereign tributary overlord over Joseon. However Joseon continued its relationship with the Ming dynasty and showed defiance in solidifying its tributary relationship with the Later Jin. It was followed by the Qing invasion of Joseon in 1636.

Background

The kingdom of Joseon had previously sent 10,069 musketeers and 3,000 archers to aid the Ming dynasty in attacking the Later Jin in 1619, which culminated in an allied defeat at the Battle of Sarhū. The Joseon general Gang Hong-rip surrendered with his remaining forces and insisted that Joseon did not hold anything against the Jurchens, having only sent reinforcements to repay an obligation to Ming.

In 1623, a faction at the Joseon court known as the Westerners deposed King Gwanghaegun (Hangul: 광해군, Hanja: 光海君) and installed Injo as king. The following year Yi Gwal rebelled against King Injo, but failed in ousting him, and the rebellion was crushed. Its survivors fled to the Jin court where they recommended Hong Taiji to invade Joseon. General Gang Hong-rip was also led to believe by the survivors that his family had died in the coup, so he pushed for the invasion out of a desire for revenge.

Meanwhile the Westerners took on an explicitly pro-Ming and anti-Jurchen stance in their relations with the two states. Injo severed relations with the Later Jin on the advice of his advisers. The Ming general Mao Wenlong's army of 26,000 men engaged in raids against the Jurchens from an island base off the Korean peninsula. The Westerners aided him by allowing him to station his troops in Uiju. 

The Later Jin had lost at the Battle of Ningyuan the previous year and their Khan, Nurhaci, died from his wounds afterwards. Peace negotiations with the Ming after the battle delayed an aggressive Ming response to the Jurchen loss, and the Ming general Yuan Chonghuan was busy fortifying the border garrisons and training new musketeers. The new Khan, Hong Taiji, was eager for a quick victory to consolidate his position. By invading Joseon he also hoped to extract much needed resources for his army and subjects, who had suffered in the war against Ming.

War

In 1627, Hong Taiji dispatched Amin, Jirgalang, Ajige and Yoto to Joseon with 30,000 troops under the guidance of Gang Hong-rip and Li Yongfang. The Jurchens met sharp resistance at the border towns but Joseon border garrisons were quickly defeated. On 14 January, the Jurchen army advanced into Uiju where Mao Wenlong was stationed, and Mao quickly fled with his men into the Bohai Sea. The Neunghan Fortress fell on the 21 January. Next the Jurchens attacked Anju. When it became clear that defeat was inevitable, the Anju garrisons committed suicide by blowing up their gunpowder storehouse. Pyongyang fell without a fight and the Jin army crossed the Taedong River.

By this time, news of the invasion had reached the Ming court, which immediately dispatched a relief contingent to Joseon, slowing the Jurchen advance into Hwangju.

King Injo then dispatched an envoy to negotiate a peace treaty, but by the time the messenger returned, Injo had already fled from Hanseong (Seoul) to Ganghwa Island in panic.

Despite the Jin invasion's success, Amin was willing to negotiate a peace. The following settlement was agreed upon on Ganghwa Island:

Joseon abandons the Ming era name Tianqi (天啓).
Joseon offers Yi Gak as a hostage as a substitute for a royal prince.
(Later) Jin and Joseon will not violate each other's territory.

While negotiations were taking place, the city of Pyongyang underwent several days of looting by the Jurchens before Amin was ordered by Hong Taji to sign the peace agreement. The Jin army then withdrew to Mukden, ending the three-month-long invasion.

Aftermath

In the postwar negotiations, the Later Jin forced Joseon to open markets near the borders because its conflicts with Ming had brought economic hardship and starvation to Jin subjects. Joseon was also forced to transfer suzerainty of the Warka tribe to Jin. Furthermore, a tribute of 100 horses, 100 tiger and leopard skins, 400 bolts of cotton, and 15,000 pieces of cloth was to be extracted and gifted to the Jin Khan. Injo's brother was sent to deliver this tribute. However in later letters to the Joseon king, Hong Taiji would complain that the Koreans did not behave as if they had lost, and were not abiding by the terms of the agreement. Joseon merchants and markets continued to trade with Ming and actively aided Ming subjects by providing them with grain and rations. Hong Taiji rebuked them, saying that the food of Joseon should only be fed to Joseon subjects.

The relationship between Joseon and Later Jin remained uncomfortable and bleak. The invasion was bitterly resented by Joseon's statesmen and Confucian scholars, who believed that it was treacherous and unfilial for Joseon to abandon Ming considering the assistance it had provided against Japan in the past. This resentment was inflamed in 1636 when the Manchus demanded changing the terms of diplomatic relationship from equality to sovereign-vassal. The Joseon court, dominated by anti-Manchu hawks, rejected the demand. This led to the Qing invasion of Joseon in 1636.

The Ming general Yuan Chonghuan was impeached for having been duped by the Jin into entering peace negotiations, and court officials accused him of lack of agency. This was the last time Ming would openly engage in peace negotiations with the Jurchens.

Mao Wenlong was reported to Ming authorities by Joseon for cowardice and treachery. Mao began acting independently and minted his own coins in 1628, while conducting illicit trading in contravention of Ming law. He was caught by Yuan Chonghuan in 1629 and executed for smuggling on 24 July, 1629. Yuan reported the death of Mao Wenlong to the Joseon court, stating that it had been done to "properly establish the emperor's awesomeness." Prior to his execution, Yuan Chonghuan addressed him thus:

See also
 History of Korea
 Korean-Jurchen wars

References

Bibliography

Further reading 
 Hyŏn-hŭi Yi; Sŏng-su Pak; Nae-hyŏn Yun (2005). New history of Korea. Jimoondang

Conflicts in 1627
Wars involving Imperial China
Wars involving the Qing dynasty
Wars involving Joseon
17th century in Korea
1627 in Asia